Anglican Frontier Missions is an American-based Christian mission organization that "To plant biblically-based, indigenous churches where the church is not, among the 2 billion people and 6,000+ unreached people groups still waiting to hear the Gospel for the very first time."

History
Anglican Frontier Missions (AFM) originated at a meeting of 23 leaders of the Episcopal Church on November 1, 1990 (All Saints' Day), coinciding with the first year of the "Decade of Evangelism" of the Anglican Communion. Their decision to form a missionary society came to fruition three years later.

Founded by the Rev. E. A. de Bordenave in 1993, one thing notable about AFM is that it uses a non-denominational approach to missions, recruiting from any denomination or Christian faith tradition in order to reach the 29% of the world's population who have not heard the Christian message. This approach was new within Anglicanism.

In 2007 Dr. Julian Linnell was appointed second executive director of AFM.  English by birth, Dr. Linnell focused his efforts on mobilizing churches, mentoring individuals and sending missionaries to ethnic groups in a region stretching from North Africa, through the Middle East to Southeast Asia.  Prior to AFM, he served as a cross-cultural missionary in Southeast Asia.

The Rev. Christopher Royer was named third executive director of AFM in June 2014.  Prior to his call to Anglican Frontier Missions, Rev. Royer developed a contagious passion for the unreached and a sensitivity to cross-cultural evangelism while serving and planting churches among Muslims in the Middle East.

Identity 
Anglican Frontier Missions is committed to going where the need is greatest, to planting indigenous churches among the largest and least evangelized peoples in the world.  AFM mobilizes churches and sends short-term and long-term missionaries to do pioneer, frontier missions, where the church is not.  Anglican Frontier Missions serves as a bridge-builder enabling Christians to fulfill their call to witness to the unreached at the ends of the earth.  As a bridge-builder, AFM connects the church, the steward of the gospel, with the unreached who have not yet been able to hear it.  Thus, bridges are built both for those at home and for those at the ends of the earth.

Imperative 

Anglican Frontier Missions exists because the church does not yet exist in every ethno-linguistic nation of the world.  Some geo-political nations, like Nigeria, which is made up of 537 ethno-linguistic nations, waited 1800 years for the life-changing message of Jesus Christ.  Some 6,000 more ethno-linguistic nations are still waiting.  Even though 67 generations have come and gone since Jesus' resurrection, still over 2.0 billion people are unreached with the Gospel.  This unseen quarter of the world has no geographic and/or cultural access (or infinitesimally limited access) to churches and Christians.  In spite of the great advances made by missionaries over the years, 1/4 of the world’s entire population still has not encountered a Christian, let alone the Gospel itself.  These people will likely never have a chance to hear the Gospel before they die, unless intentional efforts are made to reach them.  Yet only 3% of the Church’s missionaries and 0.1% of its resources are going to evangelize these unreached people groups.  The two countries that send the most missionaries—the US and Brazil—are also the two countries that receive the most missionaries.

The plight of the Gentile nations during St. Paul’s time remains the plight of unreached nations today.  They can’t put their faith in Jesus if they’ve never been told about him, and they can’t be told about him unless Christians go to them with the good news.  But less than 1% of the Church’s mission resources are being used to reach them.   The 10 countries in the world containing 73% of the world’s unreached peoples receive only 9% of all international missionaries.   Meanwhile, 40% of mission resources go to 10 other countries which are oversaturated with gospel presence.  Why the large disparity between the need and our response?  The answer to this question is another question: “How can we send unless someone tells us about the unreached in the first place?”  70% of bible-believing Christians—people who know and take the Great Commission seriously—have never been told that over one-fourth of the world’s population has yet to come into contact with Christians who can tell them the good news of Jesus Christ.

Methods 

Anglican Frontier Missions partners with members of the Anglican Communion from around the world to serve as a catalyst to provinces, dioceses, churches, and individuals so that the Gospel extends to all.  There are approximately 104 million Anglicans in the world. Anglican Frontier Missions also works with other organizations, denominations, and Christian groups who share its biblical values and strategic vision to see the Good News rooted in hearts and minds of peoples who have limited, or no, access to the Gospel.

Anglican Frontier Missions sends missionaries to the largest and least-evangelized people groups in the world.  Anglican Frontier Missions accepts missionaries from any Bible-believing denominational background.

Opportunities 
Anglican Frontier Missions seeks to mobilize churches and individuals to work in areas of the world where the need is greatest, such as East Asia, the Middle East, Asia and North Africa.  Short-term Discovery Trips are one way to get involved.  These trips aim not only to get Christians connected with mission work, but also serve as a means for Christian discipleship.  Individuals who register for a short-term Discovery Trip will take part in a Missions Mentoring program both before and after the trip.  Opportunities to serve in missions abound, but long term service (3+ years) to these corners of the world is not for everyone.  This unique call requires a hardy personality, a physically fit person, and someone who not only survives but thrives in potentially difficult, isolated,  and oppressive environments.  Anglican Frontier Missions also offers training to develop Strategy Coordinators for unreached people groups.

References

External links 
Official website

Christian organizations established in 1993
Christian missionary societies
Anglican missions
Anglican organizations established in the 20th century